The second 2013 Kenyan Super Cup was a Kenyan football match contested by the 2013 Kenyan Premier League champions Gor Mahia and the 2013 KPL Top 8 Cup champions Tusker. After the two teams drew 1–1 in regulation time, Tusker won the match 5–3 in the penalty shoot-out.

Road to Cup

Kenyan Premier League standings

KPL Top 8 Cup bracket

Match details

See also
 2013 Kenyan Super Cup (pre-season)
 2012 Kenyan Super Cup

References

Super Cup 2
2013 2